Philip Pratt (July 14, 1924 – February 7, 1989) was a United States district judge of the United States District Court for the Eastern District of Michigan.

Education and career

Born in Pontiac, Michigan, Pratt was in the United States Army as a Sergeant in the Office of Strategic Services during World War II, from 1943 to 1946. He received a Bachelor of Laws from the University of Michigan Law School in 1950. He was a title examiner in the Abstract and Title department in Pontiac from 1950 to 1951. He was an assistant prosecutor for Oakland County, Michigan from 1952 to 1953. He was in private practice in Pontiac from 1953 to 1963. He was a judge of the 6th Judicial Circuit Court of Michigan from 1963 to 1970.

Federal judicial service

Pratt was nominated by President Richard Nixon on October 7, 1970, to the United States District Court for the Eastern District of Michigan, to a new seat created by 84 Stat. 294. He was confirmed by the United States Senate on November 25, 1970, and received his commission on December 1, 1970. He served as Chief Judge from 1986 to 1989. Pratt served in that capacity until his death of cancer on February 7, 1989, at his home in Bloomfield Hills, Michigan.

References

Sources
 

1924 births
1989 deaths
Michigan state court judges
Judges of the United States District Court for the Eastern District of Michigan
United States district court judges appointed by Richard Nixon
20th-century American judges
United States Army soldiers
University of Michigan Law School alumni
United States Army personnel of World War II
People of the Office of Strategic Services